Glutamine-rich protein 2 is a protein that in humans is decoded by the QRICH2 gene on human chromosome 17. The function of QRICH2 protein is mostly unknown, but it has been shown that QRICH2 gene contains a high molecular weight Glutenin domain and an ATPase involved domain. QRICH2 gene is highly expressed in testis, and the subcellular location of QRICH2 protein is in the nucleus.

Gene 
QRICH2 mRNA is 5411 bp long, and its chromosomal location in human is 17q25.1. QRICH2 mRNA has 19 exons and it contains two main function domains: a high molecular weight Glutenin domain (amino acid 446-979) and an ATPase involved domain (amino acid 1036-1413). QRICH2 locates between UBAL D2 gene and PRPSAP1 gene on chromosome 17. There is no predicted stem loop structure on QRICH2 mRNA because there isn't any complementary RNA sequences.

Protein 
QRICH2 protein is 1663 amino acids long, and 10.9% of the amino acids are Glutamine (Q). 38% of the QRICH2 protein secondary structure is alpha-helix, 39% is beta-sheet and 13% is turning. The human tissue type with the highest level of QRICH2 expression is testis, and this result is confirmed by the Gene Expression Profile for mouse and dog too. The subcellular location of QRICH2 protein is in the nucleus. QRICH2 is a soluble protein, its average hydrophobicity is -0.5995. QRICH2 protein interact with a number of other proteins including SSSCA1, TSSC1, GAPDH, NUP98 and SNAI1.

Homology

paralogs

FLJ25737 mRNA sequences perfectly match with two regions on the QRICH2 mRNA (bp 3157-4302 on QRICH2 match with bp 1-1146 on FLJ25737, bp 4998-5307 on QRICH2 match with bp 1140-1499 on FLJ25737). However, FLJ25737 locates on chromosome 7 and QRICH2 locates on chromosome 17.

Orthologs 

QRICH2 protein has well conserved orthologs in many species. The orthologous protein sequences match very well at the region where the high molecular weight Glutenin domain and ATPase involved domain is.

Function 
The function of QRICH2 protein is mostly unknown. QRICH2 has been shown to belong to the common expression groups on human chromosome 17. The following genes belonged to the common expression groups on chromosome 17: NCOR1, GFAP, QRICH2, ANAPC11 and PER1. QRICH2 may also be an up-regulated gene involved in cell adhesion and cellular morphogenesis. The high expression of QRICH2 gene in testis may suggest that QRICH2 protein has some functions related to hormone production in males. QRICH2 protein has some sequence similarities with the spermidine/spermine N(1)-acetyl-like protein 1 in several species.

References 

Genes on human chromosome 17